Edison (formerly, Wade) is an unincorporated community in the Tehachapi mountains of Kern County, California.

In 1902, the Edison Electric Company built a substation on the site. The Southern Pacific Railroad arrived at Wade in 1903, and changed the name to Edison. In 1928 oil was found nearby, and the Edison Oil Field gradually developed, peaking in the 1950s. The community is within the administrative boundaries of the oilfield, and active wells surround the town.

The Edison post office opened in 1903, closed in 1929, and re-opened in 1946.

References

Unincorporated communities in Kern County, California
Populated places established in 1902
Unincorporated communities in California